William Jarvis (September 11, 1756 – August 13, 1817) was an office holder, militia officer, and the Connecticut-born head of the Jarvis family in what is now Toronto, Ontario, Canada.

Life and career

Jarvis was born in Stamford, Connecticut, to Samuel Jarvis, who was the town's clerk, and Martha Seymour. 

William Jarvis joined John Graves Simcoe’s Queen's Rangers in 1777. He was wounded at the Battle of Spencer's Ordinary in Virginia in 1781 and was commissioned cornet in late 1782. At the cessation of the American Revolutionary War he went on half-pay and attempted to return to Connecticut, however, hostility to the Loyalists remained strong, and after an encounter with angry Patriots, fled to England. In 1791, Simcoe, who had been appointed as the first Lieutenant Governor of Upper Canada, recommended Jarvis in 1791 to the Home Secretary, Henry Dundas, for the positions of Provincial Secretary and Clerk of the Executive Council of the newly established province. Jarvis was instead given the positions of Provincial Secretary and Registrar.

Jarvis arrived in Canada with his wife and three children in 1792 and settled in Newark (now Niagara-on-the-Lake). When Simcoe moved the capital from Newark to York, Jarvis reluctantly followed. In York, he was granted a town lot and a 100 acre park lot. Jarvis built his home on the town lot, while the park lot was left largely undeveloped.

Jarvis was appointed deputy lieutenant of the county of York in 1794 and a magistrate in 1800. He was not successful in these positions or as Provincial Secretary and Registrar, losing half his income and the power to appoint local land registrars.

A plaque for a stained-glass window honouring William Jarvis at the Cathedral Church of St. James (Toronto) states "First Provincial Grand Master of the Ancient Order of Free and Accepted Masons". Jarvis had become a mason while in England, and before leaving for Canada, had been appointed Provincial Grand Master of Masons in Upper Canada.

William and Hannah Jarvis were slave-owners who opposed Simcoe's desire to abolish slavery in Upper Canada. One of their slaves, Henry Lewis made his way to Schenectady, New York, where he wrote Jarvis, offering to buy his freedom.

Personal life

Jarvis was married to Hannah Owen Peters, daughter of the Reverend Samuel Peters of Hebron, Connecticut.  They had seven children.  Their oldest son, Samuel, died in 1792 at the age of five. Their next born son, Samuel Jarvis, was named for his brother and became a prominent member of the Family Compact. His other children were Maria, Augusta, William, Hannah, and Eliza.

References

Bibliography
 Allen, Robert. "Mr. Secretary Jarvis: William Jarvis of Connecticut and York" Eleven Exiles: Accounts of Loyalists of the American Revolution, edited by Phyllis R. Blakeley and John Grant. Toronto: Dundurn Press, 1982, pp. 289–317.
 Henry, Natasha. "Brought in Bondage"
 Scadding, Henry. Toronto of Old. Toronto: Adam, Stevenson & Co., 1873.
 Schreiber, David. "William and Samuel Jarvis"

1756 births
1817 deaths
Loyalists in the American Revolution from Connecticut
Politicians from Stamford, Connecticut
People from York, Upper Canada
Immigrants to Upper Canada
Canadian slave owners